Guarea is a genus of evergreen trees or shrubs in the family Meliaceae, native to tropical Africa and Central and South America. At their largest, they are large trees 20–45 m tall, with a trunk over 1 m diameter, often buttressed at the base. The leaves are pinnate, with 4–6 pairs of leaflets, the terminal leaflet present. They are dioecious, with male and female flowers on separate plants. The flowers are produced in loose inflorescences, each flower small, with 4–5 yellowish petals. The fruit is a four or five-valved capsule, containing several seeds, each surrounded by a yellow-orange fleshy aril; the seeds are dispersed by hornbills and monkeys which eat the aril.

Species
Species accepted by Plants of the World Online as of March 2019:

Uses
The timber is important; the African species are known as bossé, guarea, or pink mahogany, and the South American species as cramantee or American muskwood.
It is said to possibly cause hallucinations if ingested.

The wood can be used for sculpture and was favoured by the British 20th century sculptor Barbara Hepworth.

References

 
Meliaceae genera
Medicinal plants
Dioecious plants